Htab, htab and HTAB may refer to:
 Horizontal tab (a US-ASCII control character)
 Hash table
 HTAB, a Honeywell version of the programming language Filetab